Lord of Lords is an album by Alice Coltrane. It was recorded in California in July 1972, and was issued in 1973 by Impulse! Records, her final release for the label. On the album, Coltrane appears on piano, organ, harp, timpani, and percussion, and is joined by bassist Charlie Haden, drummer Ben Riley, and a string ensemble, which she conducts. Lord of Lords features three original compositions along with excerpts from Igor Stravinsky's The Firebird and an arrangement of the traditional piece "Going Home". It was the third in a series of three albums (following Universal Consciousness and World Galaxy) on which Coltrane appeared with an ensemble of strings.

In the album liner notes, Coltrane stated that she received a "visitation" from Stravinsky, with whom she discussed music, and who presented her with "a small glass vial containing a clear, colorless liquid." She commented: "Since that time, it has been incumbent on me to proceed forthrightly into the
great master Stravinsky's works."

According to producer Ed Michel, Coltrane worked with the string players, who were top-rank classically-trained studio musicians, and "opened [them] up... so they could do absolutely astonishing things." He stated that, afterwards, "the string players couldn't believe that they had done what they had done."

In 2011, Impulse! reissued the album, along with Universal Consciousness, as part of a compilation titled Universal Consciousness/Lord of Lords.

Reception

In a review for AllMusic, Thom Jurek wrote: "it was obvious from the beginning that [Coltrane] was seeking to incorporate Indian classical music's drone center into her work, and was literally obsessed with the timbral, chromatic, and harmonic possibilities of strings. She succeeds here, in ending her Impulse! period with elegance, grace, and soul."

Pitchfork's Matthew Kassel stated that Lord of Lords "may be the most ecstatic record she made," calling it "unnerving, slow-building, a throbbing organism of sound." He noted that, despite the fact that Coltrane was "on her way to becoming a full-blown swamini," she "never entirely abandoned her roots.... on Lord of Lords you can hear the vestiges of bebop in her fleet-fingered organ improvisations."

Matthew Fiander of PopMatters commented: "The sheer breadth of this sound is staggering, and the way it places the formal orchestral parts alongside Coltrane’s experimentalism sounds remarkably fluid... Unruly as it may be, there's a lightness here, an acceptance of joy, an ease within the wandering."

The Vinyl District's Joseph Neff called the album "a record of striking dimension," and stated that it is distinguished by "Coltrane's comfort and level of investment in exploring arranged strings as a vessel for spiritual transcendence."

In an article for All About Jazz, Chris May described the album as "gigantic in conception... Not so much astral, as galactic jazz."

Track listing

 "Andromeda's Suffering" (Alice Coltrane) – 9:04
 "Sri Rama Ohnedaruth" (Alice Coltrane) – 6:12
 "Excerpts from The Firebird" (Igor Stravinsky, arranged by Alice Coltrane) – 5:43
 "Lord of Lords" (Alice Coltrane) – 11:17
 "Going Home" (traditional, arranged by Alice Coltrane) – 10:02

Personnel 
 Alice Coltrane – organ, piano, harp, timpani, percussion
 Charlie Haden – bass
 Ben Riley – drums

String ensemble
Violins:
 Bernard Kundell
 Gerald Vinci
 Gordon Marron
 James Getzoff
 Janice Gower
 Leonard Malarsky
 Lou Klass
 Murray Adler
 Nathan Kaproff
 Ronald Folsom
 Sidney Sharp
 William Henderson
Violas:
 David Schwartz
 Leonard Selic
 Marilyn Baker
 Myra Kestenbaum
 Rollice Dale
 Samuel Boghosian
Cellos:
 Anne Goodman
 Edgar Lustgarten
 Jan Kelly
 Jerry Kessler
 Jesse Ehrlich
 Raphael Kramer
 Ray Kelley

References

1972 albums
Alice Coltrane albums
Impulse! Records albums